Xylophagus reflectens is a species of fly in the family Xylophagidae.

Distribution
It is found in most of Canada (from Alberta to Nova Scotia), and the east of the United States.

References

Xylophagidae
Insects described in 1848
Taxa named by Francis Walker (entomologist)
Diptera of North America